The 1936 Purdue Boilermakers football team was an American football team that represented Purdue University during the 1936 college football season.  In their seventh season under head coach Noble Kizer, the Boilermakers compiled a 5–2–1 record, finished in a tie for fourth place in the Big Ten Conference with a 3–1–1 record against conference opponents, and outscored opponents by a total of 157 to 95.

Schedule

References

Purdue
Purdue Boilermakers football seasons
Purdue Boilermakers football